Vasiliy Vasilievich Griaznov (Belarusian:Васіль Васільевіч Гразноў; c.1840, place unknown — 27 February 1909, Vilnius) was a Belarusian painter, art teacher and architectural historian.

Life and work 
He also taught drawing and calligraphy in the public schools. After 1886, he taught at a girls' school.

He made numerous trips throughout Lithuania and Belarus, seeking out monuments and landmarks, then taking photographs or painting watercolors. Some of his photographs were published in the Vilnius city calendar for 1887; although it had to be produced outside of Lithuania, due to a lack of the necessary technical equipment. His graphics were often exhibited in St. Petersburg at archaeological congresses. As these works were designed for practical use, relatively few have survived. A notable example depicts the Church of St. Michael, Synkavichy. Some were used as book illustrations.

In the late 1860s, he was one of the first to investigate and describe the Kalozha Church, following its partial collapse. He found traces of forgotten frescoes, including a depiction of the Holy Trinity, and determined that the church once had a wooden bell tower.

Perhaps his best known discovery came about when he was searching through a church in Turov and came across a box of coal mixed with paper.

Gallery

References

Further reading 
 G. A. Kachanouski, Археологія і гістарычнае краязнаўства Беларусі ў XVI—XIX стст (Archaeology and History of Belarus: XVI — XIX centuries), 1984.
 Nikolay Nikolayevich Ulashchik, Введение в изучение белорусско-литовского летописания (Introduction to the study of Belarusian-Lithuanian annals), 1985.

External links

1840s births
1909 deaths
Belarusian painters
Architectural historians
Watercolorists
Belarusian emigrants to Lithuania
Stroganov Moscow State Academy of Arts and Industry alumni